Erik Ellington (born August 9, 1977) is an American professional skateboarder, entrepreneur, and designer.

Early life
Erik Ellington was born and raised in Anchorage, Alaska, to Rose Ann Ellington and Charles Luther Ellington. His parents separated at an early age and he was raised collectively by his parents and step father Johnson Quarles. In his teens, he moved to Tempe, Arizona, after the passing of his father. After graduating high school, he moved to San Diego to pursue a career as a professional skateboarder.

Professional skateboarding
Erik Ellington turned pro for Zero Skateboards in 1999 after their second video, "Misled Youth". In 2000, he left Zero to join friends and start Baker skateboards. From there, he went on to design a series of top selling shoes for Emerica, a brand under the Sole technology umbrella. In collaboration with friends Andrew Reynolds and Jim Greco, they founded Bakerboys Distribution in 2008. The company provides distribution for closely related skateboard companies, Deathwish, Baker, Shake Junt, Birdhouse, Heroin, Psockedelic and Max Allure.  

Erik co-funded Supra footwear in 2006. The company released six different Ellington signature skate shoe designs and was sold in 2015 to the Eland group.

In 2018, Erik Ellington made his way into shoe business with the launch of a new brand called Human Recreational Services. Human Recreational Services, HRS for short, was born out of a cross-continental dialogue between Erik Ellington in Los Angeles and Vaz Rajan in Paris.

Personal life
Ellington resides in Burbank with his wife Amy and his two children.

1977 births
American skateboarders
Living people
Sportspeople from Anchorage, Alaska